Gregg Rockman (born 24 May 1982) is an English ice hockey player, currently playing for Guildford Flames of the English Premier Ice Hockey League.

References

External links 

1982 births
Living people
English ice hockey goaltenders
Guildford Flames players